Malka Ribowska (20 May 1931 – 5 September 2020) was a Polish-born French actress.

Biography
Ribowska began her cinematic career in the 1950s. However, her husband, René Allio, helped put her in the spotlight in the 1965 film The Shameless Old Lady and the 1967 film L'Une et l'Autre. In the 1970s, she appeared on television dramas such as Le Sagouin and Mourning Becomes Electra.

Malka Ribowska died on 5 September 2020 at the age of 89.

Filmography

Cinema
Une histoire d'amour (1951)
Vers l'extase (1960)
The Three Musketeers (1961)
La Meule (1962)
Sundays and Cybele (1962)
Salad by the Roots (1964)
The Shameless Old Lady (1965)
Marvelous Angelique (1965)
La Seconde Verité (1966)
L'Une et l'Autre (1967)
Two Men in Town (1973)
L'affiche rouge (1976)
Le Passion de Bernadette (1989)
Transit (1991)
Mange ta soupe (1997)

Television
Les Cinq Dernières Minutes (1961)
Tout spliques étaient les Borogoves (1970)
Le Sagouin (1972)
Mourning Becomes Electra (1975)
Chéri-Bibi (1974)
Splendeurs et misères des courtisanes (1975)
Le naufrage de Monte-Cristo (1977)
Sam et Sally (1978)
La femme rompue (1978)
L'Homme de la nuit (1983)
Madame S.O.S. (1984)
Châteauvallon (1985)
Navarro (1995)

References

1931 births
2020 deaths
20th-century French actresses
21st-century French actresses
French film actresses
French television actresses
Polish film actresses
Polish emigrants to France
Actresses from Warsaw